Wetheriggs Pottery is a former pottery on the C3047 road, east of the hamlet of Clifton Dykes, in Clifton, Cumbria,   southeast of Penrith in England. It opened in the mid 19th century providing farm and housewares for local consumption, later the business diversified into craft pottery. The property is Grade II listed.

History
The pottery developed on a site belonging to the Brougham estate.  Its beginnings can be traced to 1855 when local clay from Clifton Dykes was used for the production of bricks, tiles and pipes. Production of pottery began in 1860 when John Schofield and Margaret Thorburn moved to the site from Stepney Bank Pottery in Newcastle. John Schofield died in 1917, and Margaret Thorburn in 1937. The pottery remained in the Schofield and Thorburn family's hands until 1973. It was given Ancient Monument status in 1973.

The enterprise was provided with fuel (coal) via a siding from the Eden Valley railway line, when the railway closed in 1962 the pottery kiln fell out of use. The beehive kiln remains, as does a blunger for preparing suitable clay. The steam engine used to drive the pottery machinery was restored in the 1990s by Fred Dibnah. Facilities built for visitors including a museum.

Pottery making was revived at Wetheriggs, as the only remaining steam-powered pottery in the country. Mary Chappelhow became the master potter at Wetheriggs in 2003. Production has since ceased at the site, and Chappelhow moved her studio to Brougham Hall.

From 2006 to 2014 Wetheriggs Zoo and Animal Sanctuary operated on the site until it moved to another location.

In 2016, a developer was seeking planning permission to reopen the site as a holiday village. The application included: 

In 2020, Eden District Council approved a plan for conversion to a dwelling, granting "Listed Building Consent for the redevelopment of the beehive kiln, associated drying sheds, workshops and engine room to a dwelling and the demolition of adjoining buildings and structures".

See also

Listed buildings in Clifton, Cumbria
 Grade II* listed buildings in Cumbria

References

Further reading
 Wetheriggs Country Pottery detailed description of the working pottery, via www.cumbria-industries.org.uk
 Wetheriggs Pottery: A History and Collectors Guide, Barbara Blenkinship, Spencer Publications (1998) 
 Wetheriggs Pottery on historicengland.org.uk
 The Old Kiln, Wetheriggs Pottery on historicengland.org.uk
 Wetheriggs Pottery on Pottery Studio

Ceramics manufacturers of England
Tourist attractions in Cumbria
Grade II* listed buildings in Cumbria
Clifton, Cumbria